Jarvis Hall may refer to:
Jarvis Hall (Colorado), a former Episcopalian college in Golden and Denver, Colorado
Jarvis Hall, Steyning, a former chapel in Steyning, West Sussex, used by four Nonconformist Christian denominations

Architectural disambiguation pages